Acid Orange 7, also known as 2-naphthol orange is an azo dye.  It is used for dyeing wool. It is produced by azo coupling of β-naphthol and diazonium derivative of sulfanilic acid.

References

Azo dyes
Benzenesulfonates
Organic sodium salts
2-Naphthols
Acid dyes